Poro Region is one of the 31 regions of Ivory Coast. Since its establishment in 2011, it has been one of three regions in Savanes District. The seat of the region is Korhogo and the region's population in the 2021 census was 1,040,461.

Poro is currently divided into four departments: Dikodougou, Korhogo, M'Bengué, and Sinématiali.

Notes

 
Regions of Savanes District
States and territories established in 2011
2011 establishments in Ivory Coast